Kimber Rozier (born July 20, 1989) is an American rugby union player. She was named in the Eagles 2017 Women's Rugby World Cup squad. She previously competed at the 2014 Women's Rugby World Cup in France.

Rozier plays in the Premier 15s for the Harlequins Ladies. She is a NSCA certified strength and conditioning specialist. She has dual Bachelor’s degrees in Exercise and Sport Science and Spanish. She was part of the Eagles sevens team that won bronze at the 2013 Rugby World Cup Sevens.

She began her rugby career as a freshman in 2007 at the University of North Carolina at Chapel Hill.

References

External links 
 Kimber Rozier at USA Rugby
 

1989 births
Living people
American female rugby union players
United States women's international rugby union players
21st-century American women
American female rugby sevens players